Ștefania Donica (née Păduraru; born 10 September 1989) is a Moldovan footballer who plays as a midfielder. She has been a member of the Moldova women's national team.

International career
Donica capped for Moldova at senior level during the 2007 FIFA Women's World Cup qualification (UEFA second category).

References

1989 births
Living people
Women's association football midfielders
Moldovan women's footballers
Moldova women's international footballers